Kateřina Valachová (born 15 September 1976) is a Czech politician and lawyer who served as Minister of Education, Youth and Sports of the Czech Republic in the Cabinet of Bohuslav Sobotka from 2015 to 2017. Valachová was also a member of the Chamber of Deputies from October 2017 to October 2021.

References

External links
 Official twitter

1976 births
Living people
Education ministers of the Czech Republic
Politicians from Brno
Czech Social Democratic Party Government ministers
Czech women lawyers
Masaryk University alumni
Members of the Chamber of Deputies of the Czech Republic (2017–2021)
21st-century Czech lawyers